The 2016 Miami Hurricanes football team  represented the University of Miami during the 2016 NCAA Division I FBS football season. It was the Hurricanes' 91st season of football and 13th as a member of the Atlantic Coast Conference. The Hurricanes were led by first-year head coach Mark Richt and played their home games at Hard Rock Stadium. They finished the season 9–4 overall and 5–3 in the ACC to finish in a three-way tie for second place in the Coastal Division. They were invited to the Russell Athletic Bowl where they defeated West Virginia, 31-14.

Schedule

Personnel

Coaching staff

Support staff

Roster

Game summaries

Florida A&M

Florida Atlantic

at Appalachian State

at Georgia Tech

Florida State

North Carolina

at Virginia Tech

at Notre Dame

Pittsburgh

at Virginia

at NC State

Duke

West Virginia–Russell Athletic Bowl

Rankings

2017 NFL Draft

References

Miami
Miami Hurricanes football seasons
Cheez-It Bowl champion seasons
Miami Hurricanes football